The FIBT World Championships 2004 took place in Königssee, Germany for the fourth time, doing so previously in 1979, 1986, and 1990 (Skeleton). This marked the first time all the events were in a single location at the championships since the 1996 event in Calgary, Alberta, Canada.

Bobsleigh

Two man

Four man

Two woman

Erdmann earned her third straight championship medal with her third different brakewoman. Fourth-place finisher Yvonne Cernota was brakewoman with Cathleen Martini. Cernota would die less than two weeks after the World championships on the same track in a bobsleigh accident.

Skeleton

Men

Women

Medal table

References
2-Man bobsleigh World Champions
2-Woman bobsleigh World Champions
4-Man bobsleigh World Champions
Men's skeleton World Champions
Women's skeleton World Champions

2004 in bobsleigh
IBSF World Championships
2004 in skeleton
International sports competitions hosted by Germany
2004 in German sport
Bobsleigh in Germany